Santo Antônio do Lisboa (Portuguese meaning Saint Anthony of Lisbon) is a town in the eastcentral part of the state of Piauí, Brazil. The population is 6,441 (2020 est.) in an area of 387.40 km². Its elevation is 237 m.

Population history

References

External links
 Santo Antônio de Lisboa on CityBrazil 

Municipalities in Piauí